The Edo or Benin people are  an Edoid ethnic group, primarily found in Edo State, Southern part of Nigeria. They speak the Edo language and are the descendants of the founders of the Benin Empire.  They are closely related to other ethnic groups that speak Edoid languages, such as the Esan, the Afemai, the Isoko, and the Urhobo.

The name "Benin" (and "Bini") is a Portuguese corruption, ultimately from the word "Ubini", which came into use during the reign of Oba (ruler) Ewuare, c. 1440. "Ubini", a word meaning Vexation, used by Prince Oranmiyan, son of the wealthy ruler of Uhe (Ife) to describe the frustration he encountered after he was invited to rule benin. Ubini was later corrupted to Bini by the mixed ethnicities living together at the centre; and further corrupted to Benin around 1485, when the Portuguese began trade relations with Oba Ewuare giving them coral beads.

History

Administrative region 

Edo people can be found in Nigeria's Edo State, which got its name from the primary inhabitants of the region's most notable historical conglomeration, Benin City, which is also the central capital homeland of the Edo people. Edo people also have many related groups in their immediate surroundings also encompassed by the political and administrative borders of Edo state. Most of these groups have traced their history back to the historical city center off the Benin people, Benin City. Examples of such adjacent groups include various Afemai sub-groups, the Esan people of Edo state and the Akoko Edo people situated on the state's northern borders.

Edo state was formerly part of the old Bendel state of early post-colonial Nigeria, also known as the Mid-Western Region, Nigeria. This region's influence and culture reflects that of the Edo, Urhobo, Esan and other Edo related peoples.

Dressing
Edo people have fashion accessories typically includes red beads, anklets, raffia work and so on.

Traditional beliefs

In the traditional religion of the Edo, there exists, besides the human world, an invisible world of supernatural beings acting as interceders for the human world. Offerings are made to them in their respective shrines. Osanobua is the creator and Supreme God. His son/daughter Olokun is ruler of all bodies of water and is responsible for the prosperity and fertility of his/her human followers. Another son Ogun, is the patron god of metalworkers. The epithet  Osanobua Noghodua mean God Almighty. The word Osanobua encompasses a large number of divine principles - including the divine state of being merciful, timeless, goodness, justice, sublimity, and supreme. In the Edo belief system, Osanobua has the divine attributes of omnipresence, omniscience, and omnipotence. The Supreme Deity is believed to be present everywhere and at all times.

Art and architecture 

Traditional Edo art consists of widely identifiable sculptures, plaques and masks which reflect various spiritual and historical aspects of their cultural traditions. Some of the notable Edo art pieces include the mask of the Queen Mother Idia and a vast collection of historical Edo art pieces called the Benin Bronzes which can be found not only in Nigeria but further dispersed around the world, including in museums such as New York's Metropolitan Museum of Art.

Notable Benins in Nigeria 
Ewuare II, the 40th Oba of Benin Kingdom from 2016–present.
Esther Erediauwa, the first wife of the 39th Oba of Benin kingdom, Oba Erediauwa.
Victor Uwaifo, musician, writer, sculptor, and musical instrument inventor.
Peter Odemwingie, professional footballer.
Charles Novia, film director, producer, screenwriter, actor and social commentator.african l
Osayuki Godwin Oshodin, former Vice-chancellor of University of Benin.
Benson Idahosa, evangelist, and founder of the Church of God Mission International.
Samuel Ogbemudia, politician and former military Governor of the Mid-West State
John Odigie Oyegun, politician and first national chairman of All Progressives Congress (APC) in Nigeria
Victor Ikpeba, professional footballer.
Godwin Obaseki, governor of Edo state (2015 to 2019 under APC, and from 2019 under PDP) and business man
Gabriel Igbinedion, Nigeria business man and esama of Benin kingdom.
Erhabor Emokpae, artists, director
Mercy Aigbe, is a Nigerian actress and filmmaker
Guosa Alex Guosa Igbineweka, Guosa Language Evolutionist, Creator: a Nigerian and ECOWAS indigenous zonal lingua-franca
Abel Guobadia, former Chairman of Nigeria's Independent National Electoral Commission
Jane Igharo, Nigerian-Canadian writer 
Professor Osasere Orumwense, Vice-Chancellor of University of Benin
Suyi Davies Okungbowa, African fantasy and speculative fiction author
Archbishop John Edokpolo, Honourable Minister of Trade and Founder of Edokpolor Grammar School
Chief Jacob U. Egharevba, a Bini historian and traditional chief
Rema, music artist 
Kamaru Usman, Nigerian mixed martial artist
Gbadamasi Agbonjor Jonathan (MC Edo Pikin), Nigerian comedian

Icons 

 Ewuare II

See also 

 List of the Ogiso
 Kingdom of Benin
 Oba of Benin

References

External links
Cultural Wars and National Identity - The Saga of the Yoruba and the Bini-Edo
Bini Names in Nigeria and Georgia
Edoworld -The origin of Edo/Bini people
Who are the Edos/Binis?{source Edoworld}
Nature of God in Edo Religion
Royal Art of Benin: The Perls Collection, an exhibition catalog from The Metropolitan Museum of Art (fully available online as PDF), which contains material on the Edo people

 
Ethnic groups in Nigeria